Andrew Rueb (born November 18, 1972) is an American tennis coach and former professional player.

Rueb, who was born in Washington D.C., played collegiate tennis while studying at Harvard University in the early 1990s and was a two-time Ivy League Player of the Year. He was a member of three Ivy League championship winning teams and served as the side's captain in his senior year.

On the professional tour, Rueb had a best singles world ranking of 378 and featured in the qualifying draw for the 1998 US Open. He qualified for the men's doubles main draw of the 1997 Wimbledon Championships (with Robbie Koenig) and was a doubles quarter-finalist at the ATP Tour tournament in Long Island in 1999.

Following his professional tennis career he returned to the university and completed a master's degree at Harvard Divinity School. Soon after he joined the Harvard men's tennis team as a coach and served a long apprenticeship as an assistant to Dave Fish, before being promoted to head coach in 2018.

ITF Futures titles

Singles: (1)

Doubles: (9)

References

External links
 
 

1972 births
Living people
American male tennis players
Tennis people from Washington, D.C.
Harvard Crimson men's tennis players
Harvard Divinity School alumni
Tennis players from Washington, D.C.
Sports coaches from Washington, D.C.